Sarbeswar Mohanty (born 23 May 1995) is an Indian cricketer. He made his Twenty20 debut for Odisha in the 2018–19 Syed Mushtaq Ali Trophy on 21 February 2019.

References

External links
 

1995 births
Living people
Indian cricketers
Odisha cricketers
People from Balasore
Cricketers from Odisha